Roxen is a Pakistani rock band from Lahore, Punjab, Pakistan. The band had a debut studio album Rozen-e-Deewar, released in 2006. Following this, the band had singles "Toh Phir Aao" and "Tera Mera Rishta" which featured as soundtracks for the Bollywood movie Awarapan in 2007.

Music 
Roxen was formed back in September 2002 with initial line up of Mustafa "Musti" Zahid, Jawad, known onstage as Jodi, and Omar. Their debut song was "Yaadein". After a couple of months they came out with web release of the demo song, "Tau Phir Aoo". The song registered over 65000 downloads in one month.

Roxen's debut album, Rozen-E-Deewar, was released on 31 August 2006, on Fire Records in Pakistan, Hom Records in India and on Sangeet Records in the United States, Canada, and the Middle East.

The release date for Roxen's second album Bhoola Samundar, has not been announced. The album is scheduled to be released by Universal Music.

In 2015, Roxen released their single "Anjanay Raaston" for the drama series Mere Khwaab Lauta Do.

Discography

Albums

Bollywood

Pakistani drama soundtrack

Singles
 "Bujh Hay Gaya"
 "Meray Saathiya"
 "Kaisay Jiyein" - Also used in the Bollywood film Murder 3 as "Hum Jee Lenge"
 "Dil Main Tum" - Revised with Bunny
 "Na Kar Deewana" - Also used in the Bollywood film Awarapan as "Tera Mera Rishta"
 "Meray Saathiya" (2018)

Band members

Current members 
As of 2018, the band has 3 members:
Mustafa Zahid - Vocals, lyrics and compositions
Haider Halim - Lead guitars, backing vocals and compositions
Shahan Khan - guitar, bass

See also 
 List of Pakistani music bands

References

External links 
 

Desi musical groups
Pakistani musical groups
Pakistani rock music groups
Musical groups established in 2000